The 2015–16 Costa Rican FPD is the 96th season of the Costa Rican top-flight football league. It is divided in two championships: the Invierno and Verano seasons.

Format
The season format was changed from previous years. The season will still be split into two tournaments, the Invierno and Verano. Also, each tournament's regular stage will still consist of a double-round robin. However, the top four teams from the regular stage will advance to a "quadrangular" double-round robin instead of a play-off stage. If the team with the most points in regular stage finishes with the most points in the quadrangular, they will automatically win the tournament. Otherwise, the regular stage and quadrangular winners will play to decide the tournament's champion.

Teams 

''Note: Table lists in alphabetical order.

Managerial changes

Invierno

First stage

Quadrangular

Statistical leaders

Verano

First stage

Quadrangular

Statistical leaders

Verano Finals 
Because different teams won the regular season title and the quadrangular tournament, those two winners, Saprissa and Herediano, will play a two-legged play-off to determine the Verano champions.

Aggregate table 
The aggregate table only factors in regular season results and ignores the quadrangular tournaments.

Awards 
On 31 May 2017, the UNAFUT held a ceremony in the national auditorium of the Museo de los Niños to deliver the Liga FPD awards for the season.

Per individual tournament

Per overall season 

1 Awarded to the mentioned players due to their number of matches played in the Liga FPD.
2 Goalkeeper Minor Álvarez received the award for aiding San Carlos' Érick Zúñiga during the last matchday of the Verano 2017 season, at the cost of receiving a goal during his action.

Attendances

References

External links
 Costa Rican FPD (Spanish)

Liga FPD seasons
1
Costa